Saigon Naval Shipyard is a former French Navy, Republic of Vietnam Navy (RVNN) and Vietnam People's Navy (VPN) base in Saigon Vietnam.

The shipyard was originally created around 1788 by Lord Nguyễn Phúc Ánh as the Chu Su Naval workshop. With help from French engineers Lord Nguyen built a fleet of ships that helped him defeat the Tây Sơn dynasty and establish him as Emperor Gia Long. The naval workshop was progressively expanded and after the French conquered Cochinchina in 1862 they expanded the area as the Port de la Marine (Naval Port) under the control of the French Navy.

The French Navy expanded the base facilities making it the Navy headquarters and home to the Naval Artillery and barracks. In 1864 the Navy expanded the Chu Su Naval workshop into the Naval Arsenal and Shipyard which by 1888 had modern facilities including a 168m drydock. In 1902 the base became the headquarters of the Naval Forces of the Oriental Seas under the command of a Vice Admiral who controlled 38 ships and over 3800 officers and sailors. By 1918 the shipyard was capable of building vessels of up to 3500 Deadweight tonnage (DWT).

With the departure of the French the base passed to the control of the RVNN. In 1955 the shipyard was renamed the Ba Son Shipyard and it was capable of building vessels up to 10,000 DWT and repairing vessels up to 35,000 DWT.

Starting in 1965, the shipyard built 90 Yabuta junks for the Junk Force to replace their wooden junks. Mr. Yabuta, a Japanese engineer at the shipyard in 1961, originally designed the  junk. Armed with a .30-caliber machine gun, it featured a 110-horsepower diesel engine capable of generating ten knots of speed and was built entirely out of fiberglass, which obviated the need to treat the hulls for wood-boring Teredo worms. Wooden junks, by contrast, needed to have their hulls scraped, blow-torched and resealed every three months. The U.S. Military Assistance Program provided funds for building materials and engines, and the Vietnamese paid the wages of the shipyard laborers who built the junks. After the first Yabutas were completed, output slowed significantly. In 1966 the shipyard built only nine junks and in 1967, just 15. Production went from three junks a week in 1965 to one every five weeks in 1967 as private construction firms lured shipyard workers away with salaries, on average, three times higher than what the government had paid them.

At 03:00 on 31 January 1968 at the start of the Tet Offensive, twelve Viet Cong (VC) sappers approached the base in two civilian cars, killing two guards at a barricade at Me Linh Square and then advanced towards the base gate. The sound of gunfire alerted base sentries who secured the gate and sounded the alarm. A .30-caliber machine gun on the second floor of the headquarters disabled both cars and killed or wounded several sappers while the Navy security force organized a counterattack. Simultaneously a U.S. Navy advisor contacted the U.S. military police who soon attacked the VC from adjoining streets, the resulting crossfire ended the attack, killing eight sappers with two captured.

With the Fall of Saigon the base was taken over by the VPN which continues to use the barracks at 1A Ton Duc Thang to the present day. In 2015 the Ba Son Shipyard was closed and sold to a private developer who later demolished all the facilities to make way for apartment development.

References

Military installations of the Socialist Republic of Vietnam
Naval installations of the Republic of Vietnam
Buildings and structures in Ho Chi Minh City
1788 establishments in Asia
2015 disestablishments in Vietnam